The Bulford Kiwi is a large depiction of a kiwi, carved in the chalk on Beacon Hill above the military town of Bulford on Salisbury Plain in Wiltshire, England. It was created in 1919 by soldiers of the New Zealand Expeditionary Force who were awaiting repatriation following the end of First World War.

It is one of the few hill figures in Wiltshire to be neither a white horse nor a military badge.

History
Sling Camp (now gone), part of Bulford Camp, was established in June 1916 for the New Zealand Expeditionary Force (NZEF). Soldiers of the NZEF underwent training here when arriving in England before being transferred to New Zealand units serving on the Western Front. The Kiwi was constructed on Beacon Hill overlooking the camp.

After the war was over, the New Zealand soldiers were eager to return home, but no troop ships were available. In the wake of riots by disaffected soldiers, their commanding officers decided that the troops should be kept busy carving an enormous kiwi into the chalk of the hill. This was done in February and March 1919, by the Canterbury and Otago Engineers Battalions. The emblem is cut out of the chalk hillside, and stands out in contrast from the surrounding vegetation.

The design was executed by Sergeant-Major Percy Cecil Blenkarne, a drawing instructor in the Education Staff, from a sketch of a stuffed kiwi specimen in the British Museum. The site was surveyed and the design extended on to the site by Sergeant-Major V.T. Low, NZE of the Education Staff.

Size

After the war
In the years after the Kiwi's creation, the Kiwi Polish Company maintained the Kiwi through their offices in London, employing local villagers to do the work. Although it had "little if any advertising value [for the company]", they explained their interest in its upkeep as its being a memorial to the New Zealand troops.

During World War II, the Kiwi was camouflaged with leaf mould, out of concerns that German bombers would use it as a navigation marker during their raids over Britain. In 1948, the leaf mould was removed by local Boy Scouts, and fresh chalk was added. The Scout troop subsequently renamed themselves in the kiwi's honour.

In the early 1950s, Blenkarne negotiated for the Kiwi to be maintained by the British Army's 3 (UK) Divisional Headquarters and Signal Regiment following on from the work done by 249 Signal Squadron. 3 DHQ&SR was part of the 3rd Infantry Division.

In 1986, a pillar with a commemorative plaque was unveiled by Bryce Harland, New Zealand High Commissioner.

As of 2007, the Kiwi is maintained by the Ministry of Defence. In 2017 the chalk figure was designated as a scheduled monument.

On 30 June 2018 the Kiwi was given a resurfacing. 100 tons of chalk were ferried by Chinook helicopter to the site where under the guidance of Richard Osgood, a Defence Infrastructure Organisation archaeologist, it was spread over the figure to restore it for the first time in 30 years.

Viewing and access
Views of the kiwi are largely obscured, as the straight-ahead view is from within the camp. The kiwi is visible from Tidworth Road which passes the kiwi from the left at a skewed angle, and it is possible to walk up from there to the kiwi. Very distorted views of the kiwi from the right of the hill can be seen from Woodhenge and from near Stonehenge.

Nearby
There have been several military hill figures in Wiltshire, and this is the only surviving example which does not depict a badge. Roughly 20 miles from the Bulford Kiwi are the Fovant Badges, a group of eight military badges cut mostly by camps in World War I. There used to be more badges on the hill, and there are two more recently restored nearby at Sutton Mandeville; an outline of Australia is nearby in Compton Chamberlayne. Another nearby military badge is Lamb Down Military Badge near Codford St. Mary.

References

Further reading

External links

Google Maps image of the Kiwi

Hill figures in England
New Zealand art
Military history of Wiltshire
New Zealand in World War I
Geography of Wiltshire
Monuments and memorials in Wiltshire
1919 works
Kiwi
Tourist attractions in Wiltshire
Scheduled monuments in Wiltshire